

Northern Indiana

The 219 area code covers the northwest part of the state, including the cities of Gary, Hammond, Merrillville, Valparaiso and Michigan City.
The 574 area code covers north-central Indiana, and includes the cities of South Bend, North Judson and Warsaw.
The 260 area code covers the northeast section of Indiana, including Fort Wayne and Angola.

Prior to January 2002, the entire northern part of Indiana was under the 219 area code. Population growth and increases in cell phone numbers resulted in the 219 region being split into 3 sections. After a random drawing, Northwest Indiana was allowed to retain the 219 area code.

Central Indiana

The 765 area code covers the entire central part of the state, with the exception of the Indianapolis Metro area.
The 317 and 463 area codes covers the Metro Indianapolis area. The counties covered by 317 are Boone County, Hancock County, Hamilton County, Hendricks County, Johnson County, Marion County, Morgan County and Shelby County.

317 covered all of Northern and Central Indiana until 1948, when 219 was created. Central Indiana remained under the 317 banner until 1997, when growth in and around Indianapolis prompted the creation of 765. The 317 area code was, in turn, overlaid by 463 in 2016.

Southern Indiana

When the first area codes were mapped out, southern Indiana was assigned 812 and has retained it ever since. The cities of Evansville, Vincennes, Terre Haute, Bloomington, Columbus, Madison and Jeffersonville are all included in the 812 area code.
The entire area served by 812 received an overlay code of 930 in 2014, with 10-digit dialing initially planned to become mandatory throughout the area on September 6 of that year but ultimately delayed until February 7, 2015.

Timeline for expansion and exhaustion

According to the Indiana Office of Utility Consumer Counselor, the 812 area code was set to run out of numbers by 2015. Following the 930 overlay, no additional relief should be necessary for the foreseeable future.

317 was set to run out of numbers in 2017, and as a result the 463 overlay was implemented. Likewise, after the 317/463 overlay, no additional relief should be necessary in Indianapolis for the foreseeable future.

The northern area codes are not expected to run out until beyond 2040, and 765 should not run out of numbers until around 2030.

See also

References

 
Indiana
Area codes